The Michigan Wolverines comprise 29 varsity sports teams at the University of Michigan. These teams compete in the NCAA's Division I and in the Big Ten Conference in all sports except women's water polo, which competes in the NCAA inter-divisional Collegiate Water Polo Association. Team colors are maize and blue, though these are different shades of "maize" and "blue" from those used by the university at large. The winged helmet is a recognized icon of Michigan Athletics.

In 13 of the previous 22 years (as of the end of 2021–22), Michigan has finished in the top five of the NACDA Directors' Cup, a list compiled by the National Association of Collegiate Directors of Athletics that charts institutions' overall success in college sports. Just as impressive, UM has finished in the top ten of the Directors' Cup standings in twenty-two of the award's twenty-eight seasons (through 2022); good to be tied for 4th best nationally.

Sports sponsored 

The University of Michigan Athletic Department sponsors teams in 14 men's and 15 women's NCAA sanctioned sports.

Baseball 

The men's baseball team won national championships in 1953 and 1962 and has sent 138 players to the major leagues. The current coach of the Michigan Wolverines is Erik Bakich, who came to the University of Michigan after the 2012 season when Rich Maloney stepped down. Michigan has won 35 conference championships, made 25 NCAA Tournament appearances and won those 2 national titles. For 13 seasons from 1990 to 2002, Michigan won a lone Big Ten title in 1997 and made just one NCAA appearance in 1999. In 2015, Coach Bakich led the program to its first NCAA tournament berth since 2008 after needing to win the Big Ten tournament to qualify. In 2019, the Michigan Wolverines baseball team made it to the College World Series in Omaha, Nebraska, its first trip to the College World Series since 1984.

Basketball

Men's basketball 

The men's basketball team plays its games at Crisler Center. The Wolverines have won 14 Big Ten regular season titles, as well as the inaugural Big Ten tournament in 1998, which it later forfeited due to NCAA violations. The team has appeared in the NCAA Final Four on eight occasions (1964, 1965, 1976, 1989, 1992*, 1993*, 2013, 2018) and won the National Championship in 1989 under Steve Fisher. The program later vacated its 1992 and 1993 Final Four appearances due to NCAA violations. Other notable players who played for Michigan include Roy Tarpley, Loy Vaught, Gary Grant, Terry Mills, Glen Rice, Jalen Rose, Rumeal Robinson, Rickey Green, Phil Hubbard, Jamal Crawford, Juwan Howard, Chris Webber, Jimmy King, Ray Jackson, Cazzie Russell, Daniel Horton, Campy Russell, and Mark Hughes.

During the 1990s, the program became involved in a scandal involving payments from a booster named Ed Martin to four players: Chris Webber, Maurice Taylor, Robert Traylor, and Louis Bullock. The scandal ultimately resulted in four years' probation and a self-imposed ban from postseason play in the 2002–03 season. UM also voluntarily vacated regular season wins and NCAA tournament games from selected past seasons. Vacating the results of 113 games won while the four players were eligible, including the 1992 and 1993 Final Fours, the entire 1992–93 season, and all seasons from fall 1995 through spring 1999. After the scandal, Michigan men's basketball would then go 10 years without making the NCAA tournament from 1999 to 2008. They would eventually end the drought in 2009 under then-head coach John Beilein. In 2013, the program would reach its first Final Four in 20 years before falling to Louisville in the national championship, 82–76. The program reached another Final Four in 2018, its second under Beilein. The team would once again reach the championship game, but instead fall to the Villanova Wildcats men's basketball. Beilein would accept a position as the Cleveland Cavaliers head coach after 12 years at Michigan. His replacement for the following season would be alumnus Juwan Howard.

Women's basketball 

Michigan traveled to St. Thomas for the Paradise Jam tournament over Thanksgiving weekend in 2011. They took on Prairie View A&M in their first game on Thanksgiving Day, and won 59–53. In their second game, they faced Washington State and won easily, 69–39. On the final day of the tournament, they played Marquette, and won 71–51, to win the 2011 Paradise Jam (Reef Division) Championship. Jenny Ryan had a double-double, with 13 points and ten rebounds, to help Michigan to a 7–0 record on the year.

The women's basketball team is coached by Kim Barnes Arico, who became the head coach in 2012. Formerly the head coach of the St. John's Red Storm, Arico was named the Big East Conference Coach of the Year for 2012.

Cross country 
The men's and women's cross country teams have been nationally renowned since 1974 when Ron Warhurst started coaching the men, and more recently as alum Mike McGuire took on the women's team in 1991. The women's team has qualified for the NCAA championships every year but two since 1988, finishing 2nd in 1994, and winning five consecutive Big Ten titles from 2002 to 2006. The men's team has qualified for the NCAA 24 times in the last 34 years, with a highest finish of 4th. Michigan men have won seven Big Ten titles in that period.

Football

The Wolverines have won a record 962 games and have the most all-time wins and the third highest winning percentage in college football history, after Boise State and Ohio State. Michigan won the inaugural Rose Bowl in 1902, the first college bowl game ever played. The Wolverine football program has claimed 11 national titles.

Michigan's 11 national championships have come under the direction of five coaches. The first six were garnered by the team's first coaching superstar, Fielding H. Yost. Yost directed his "Point-a-Minute" teams to four consecutive national titles from 1901 to 1904, amassing a record of 41–0–1. Yost also led Michigan to national titles in 1918 and 1923. Yost was instrumental in the creation of Michigan Stadium and designed it to permit its expansion to expand to a capacity of over 150,000. Yost's legacy also lives on with Yost Ice Arena, where Michigan's men's ice hockey team plays their home games. Michigan football has won five more national titles since Yost permanently retired in 1926. The Wolverines won back-to-back titles under Harry Kipke in 1932 and 1933 and two more consecutive championships under Fritz Crisler and Bennie Oosterbaan in 1947 and 1948. Michigan won its most recent national title under Lloyd Carr in 1997.

Michigan's famous football coaches include: Yost, who came to Michigan from Stanford University in 1901, Fritz Crisler, who guided Michigan to a pair of Big Ten Conference championships and the 1947 national title, has his name carried by the home of Michigan men's basketball team, Bo Schembechler won 13 Big Ten titles in his 21 seasons as head coach between 1969 and 1989, the first in 1969 when he beat his friend and mentor Woody Hayes, beginning of "The Ten Year War" era of the Michigan – Ohio State football rivalry, Lloyd Carr won five Big Ten titles in his 13 seasons at the helm and posted a winning percentage of .753. His winning percentage of .779 in conference play trails only that of Schembechler in Michigan history, Rich Rodriguez succeeded Carr following his retirement in 2007. Rodriguez coached the Wolverines through the 2010 season, compiling a record of 15–22. Rodriguez would be followed by coach Brady Hoke who would go onto coach four seasons. Hoke would end with a record of 31-20. Alumnus Jim Harbaugh would replace Hoke for the 2015 season.

Rivalries

Michigan has a major rivalry with Ohio State, considered one of the fiercest rivalries in American sports. In a pair of ESPN fan polls, in 2000 and 2003, the Michigan–Ohio State series was voted the greatest rivalry in sports in America. Michigan's meeting with Ohio State is almost always the last game of the two schools' regular seasons and has provided many memorable contests, such as the "Snow Bowl" of 1950. The game has frequently decided the Big Ten Champion. Michigan leads the series 58–50–6. The contest on November 18, 2006 marked the first time ever these teams had been ranked No. 1 and No. 2 going into the game, and the first time they were both undefeated since 1973. The 2007 college football match-up between Ohio State and Michigan was predicted to be the No. 2 college football game to watch in 2007 by SI.com's "Top 20 Games To Watch in 2007" list.

Michigan has a spirited rivalry with the Notre Dame Fighting Irish. Michigan leads the series 25–17–1. The two schools are among the top college football programs in all-time wins (Michigan first, Notre Dame fifth) and winning percentage (Michigan third, Notre Dame fourth) in the NCAA Division I Football Bowl Subdivision (formerly Division I-A), so it is perhaps fitting that when college football was in its infancy, students from the University of Michigan traveled to South Bend to teach the game to students there.

Michigan also has an intrastate rival in Michigan State; the schools' football teams compete for the Paul Bunyan Trophy. Michigan leads the series 68–34–5.

The Wolverines also have a tradition-rich history with the Minnesota Golden Gophers. The two football teams compete for the Little Brown Jug, a five-gallon jug with the respective schools' "M"s on either side and the scores of previous games down the middle. The Little Brown Jug was the first trophy played for between college football teams. Through 2017, Michigan leads the Brown Jug series 75–25–3.

Field hockey

Women's field hockey became a varsity sport at Michigan in 1973. The Wolverines field hockey team won the 2001 NCAA title, which was the school's first national title in a women's team sport. Marcia Pankratz served as the head coach of the program from 1996 to 2004 and returned to the position in 2009. The Wolverines have won a total of eight Big Ten regular season titles and five Big Ten tournaments.

Golf

Men's golf
Men's golf has been a varsity sport at Michigan since 1919. The team's first coach was elocution and oratory professor Thomas Trueblood who served as coach from 1920 to 1935. Trueblood led the Michigan golf team to consecutive national championships in 1934 and 1935. Two coaches, Bert Katzenmeyer (1947–1968) and Jim Carras (1982–2002), have had tenures of at least 20 years with the program. Andrew Sapp has been the coach since 2002. In 2009, Sapp led the team to its best record in more than 50 years with 6th-place finish at the NCAA championship finals. Chris Whitten became head coach in 2011 and led the team to a runner-up finish in 2013. Three Michigan golfers have won the individual intercollegiate golf championships: Johnny Fischer (1932), Chuck Kocsis (1936), and Dave Barclay (1947). The team has won the Big Ten Conference Championship 12 times: 1932–36, 1942–44, 1946–47, 1949, and 1952.

Women's golf
Women's golf has been a varsity sport at Michigan since 1976. Cheryl Stacy, a former All-American golfer for Ohio State, took over as the team's head coach in 2009. In the fall of 2009, Stacy signed a trio of highly rated high school golfers from Ohio, Florida and Georgia to national letters of intent for the 2010–11 academic year. 

The Wolverines won their first Big Ten Championship in 2022 by four shots with a total of 857.

Gymnastics

Men's gymnastics

The Michigan men's gymnastics team has won 6 NCAA championships, 18 Big Ten championships and have been invited to 33 NCAA tournaments. Newt Loken was the head coach for 36 years from 1948 to 1983, during which time he coached the Wolverines to two NCAA team gymnastics championships, two NCAA team trampoline championships, and 21 NCAA individual event championships. Since 1999, head coach Kurt Golder has led Michigan to national championships in 1999, 2010, 2013, 2014 and the Super Six at the NCAA tournament in 13 of the last 14 seasons.

Until 1969, men's trampoline was one of the events that comprised the NCAA gymnastics championships. At that time, the event was removed in order to conform to the international gymnastics itinerary. The NCAA then bestowed a separate national title in trampoline for two years, both won by Michigan.

Women's gymnastics

Women's gymnastics has been a varsity sport at Michigan since 1976. Bev Plocki has been the head coach of the women's gymnastics team since 1990. Under Plocki's leadership, the Wolverines have won 25 Big Ten championships, advanced to 28 consecutive NCAA tournaments (1993–2021) and had seven seasons in which they finished in the Top 5 at the NCAA tournament. The Wolverines gymnastics team won their first NCAA Championship in 2021.

Ice hockey

The Wolverines ice hockey team, which was a member of the Central Collegiate Hockey Association until 2013 and is now a member of the Big Ten Conference, plays its home contests at Yost Ice Arena. The hockey team was coached by Red Berenson, a former UM player and is currently coached by Mel Pearson. Altogether, the program has won nine NCAA national championships (1948, 1951, 1952, 1953, 1955, 1956, 1964, 1996, 1998), which is also an NCAA record. In 2011, the team was invited to the NCAA tournament for a record 21st year in a row. In 2011, Michigan reached the national semi-finals (now referred to as the "Frozen Four") for an unmatched 24th time.

Vic Heyliger led Michigan to a record six NCAA titles, including the first one in college hockey history in 1948. Heyliger, who played for the Wolverines from 1935 to 1937, also won national titles as Michigan coach in 1951, 1952, 1953, 1955 and 1956. He was inducted into the U.S. Hockey Hall of Fame in 1974, in recognition of his lifetime achievement. Heyliger is considered instrumental in getting the NCAA Tournament off the ground. Following the 1946–47 season, Heyliger wrote to each of the college coaches around the country to see if they would be interested in creating a national tournament. They obliged and the inaugural four-team NCAA tournament began the following season in 1948. Heyliger was 228–61–13 as head coach at Michigan, and his .776 winning percentage is the best at the school. His only losing season was his first year, 3–6 in 1944–45.

In 1980, Heyliger was inducted into the University of Michigan Hall of Honor. The Vic Heyliger Trophy has been given out at the end of each season by the Michigan hockey team to recognize its most outstanding defenseman.

Lacrosse

Women's Lacrosse

Men's lacrosse

The Michigan men's lacrosse team is one of the oldest collegiate lacrosse programs in the midwest, having been founded in 1940, the program is also the most successful athletic program at Michigan, with an .830 all-time win percentage. The program was elevated from varsity-club status to NCAA status by the university in May 2011 and began NCAA Division I competition in 2012. The Wolverines previously competed at the Division I level of the Men's Collegiate Lacrosse Association (MCLA), in the Central Collegiate Lacrosse Association (CCLA). In 2008 the team became the first MCLA team to complete a season undefeated, finishing 20–0 and winning their first national championship at Texas Stadium. The feat was repeated in 2009 with another 20–0 season and earned their second national championship with a 12–11 victory over Chapman University at Dick's Sporting Goods Park in Denver, Colorado. In 2010, they won their third MCLA national championship in a row, defeating Arizona State University 12–11 in Denver.

Women's rowing
Women's rowing has been a varsity at sport at Michigan since 1996. Mark Rothstein has been the team's coach for 18 years – since it was a club sport in 1991. Rothstein led the rowing program "from an over-achieving club squad to one of the nation's top-notch varsity rowing programs." The team has placed in the Top 10 at the NCAA tournament ten times in the past 12 years. The team's best seasons came in 2000–01 and 2011–12 with Big Ten championships and second-place finishes in the NCAA tournament.

Soccer

Men's soccer

The men's soccer team plays Michigan State annually for the rights to the Big Bear Trophy, a wooden sculpture purchased by Michigan head coach Steve Burns in 2000. The men's soccer advanced to the College Cup in 2010, their first in program history. More recently, the program won its first Big Ten championship in 2017.

Women's soccer

The women's soccer team has played at the varsity level since 1994 and has twice won the Big Ten conference tournament, in 1997 and 1999. It has also reached the quarterfinals of the NCAA Division I Women's Soccer Championship twice, in 2002 and 2013 during the tenure of Debbie Rademacher, who coached the team from its inception until 2007. The team is currently coached by Jennifer Klein.

Softball

Carol Hutchins has been the head coach of the Michigan Wolverines softball team since 1985. With a career record of 1,274–435–4 (.745 winning percentage), Hutchins has more wins than any other coach in the history of the university—in both men's and women's athletics. Hutchins' teams have won 22 Big Ten championships and appeared in 28 NCAA tournaments. In June 2005, the team won the NCAA Division I Softball Championship, defeating two-time defending champion and perennial softball power UCLA two games to one. Michigan won the decisive game, 4-1, with Samantha Findlay slamming a three-run homer in the top of the tenth inning. Michigan was the first school east of the Mississippi River to win the Women's College World Series since rival Michigan State (with Carol Hutchins playing shortstop) did so in 1976. The Wolverines have appeared in 13 Women's College World Series in 1982, 1995–98, 2001–02, 2004–05, 2009, 2013 and 2015–16.

Swimming and diving

Men's swimming and diving
Men's swimming and diving has been a varsity sport at Michigan since 1921. With 12 NCAA national championships (as well as 7 unofficial) including the 2013 NCAA championship, the Michigan men's swimming and diving team has won more national championships than any other varsity sport in the history of the university. In addition to its 19 national championships, the team has finished in the Top 5 nationally 48 times. The team's swimmers have also won 145 individual NCAA championships. Three head coaches have led the squad for a combined 77 years: Matt Mann (1925–54), Gus Stager (1954–82) and Jon Urbanchek (1982–2004). Michigan swimmers and divers inducted into the International Swimming Hall of Fame include Mike Barrowman, Dick Degener, Tom Dolan, Taylor Drysdale, Bruce Harlan, Harry Holiday, Dick Kimball, Carl Robie, and Bob Webster. Mike Bottom took over as the team's head coach in 2008. In his first season as the team's head coach, Bottom led the Wolverines to a Big Ten championship and a 7th-place finish at the NCAA championship. In 2013, Bottom won the program's 12th official NCAA national championship (19th overall) and its first since 1995.

Women's swimming and diving
Women's swimming and diving has been a varsity sport at Michigan since 1974. The team has won 19 Big Ten championships, including 12 consecutive championships from 1986 to 1998. The team has also finished in the Top 10 teams nationally 17 times. The team's best finish came in the 1994–95 season with a second-place finish in the national tournament. The team has produced several national individual champions, including Julie Bachman (one-meter and three-meter diving, 1978), Emily Brunemann (1,650-yard freestyle, 2008), Ann Colloton (200-yard backstroke, 1989), Mary Fischbach (one-meter and three-meter diving, 1988), Mindy Gehrs (400-yard individual medley, 1993), Lara Hooiveld (100-yard and 200-yard breaststroke, 1993), Alecia Humphrey (100-yard backstroke, 1994; 200-yard backstroke 1994 and 1995), Sue Cahill (400-yard individual medley, 1982), and Chris Seufert (one-meter and three-meter diving, 1977). Jim Richardson is in his 25th season as the head coach of the women's swimming and diving team.

Tennis

Men's tennis

Michigan's men's tennis team was formed in 1893. Between 1948 and 1999, the team had two head coaches. William Murphy was the coach from 1948 to 1969 and led the Wolverines to 11 Big Ten championships and the NCAA championship in 1957. Brian Eisner was the coach from 1969 to 1999 and led the team to 16 Big Ten championships and 21 NCAA tournament appearances. Peter Fishbach and Eric Friedler played for the school. Joel Ross was captain of the tennis team, and was Big Ten singles champion in 1971. 

Berque was the head coach from 2004 to 2014 and led the team to four consecutive appearances in the NCAA tournament. The current coach is Adam Steinberg.

Women's tennis

Women's tennis was established as a varsity sport in 1973. Bitsy Ritt was the head coach for 22 years from 1984 to 2006 and led the team to NCAA tournament berths in 8 of her last 11 years as head coach. The current head coach is Ronni Bernstein who has led the team to NCAA tournament berths in her first two years with the program.

Track and field

Men's track and field

The men's track and field team has won 57 Big Ten men's team titles and one NCAA team championship. Notable alumni include Ralph Craig, winner of two gold medals at the 1912 Olympics, Brian Diemer, 1984 Summer Olympics bronze medalist in the steeplechase, Bill Donakowski, U.S. marathon champion in 1986, Archie Hahn, a winner of four Olympic gold medals at the 1904 and 1906 Olympics, DeHart Hubbard, the first African-American to win an individual Olympic gold medal and a former world record holder in the long jump, Greg Meyer, 1983 Boston Marathon winner, Ralph Rose, winner of 3 gold, 2 silver and 1 bronze medals in three Olympic games, Kevin Sullivan, Canadian 1500 meter record holder, Eddie Tolan, winner of two gold medals and a former world record holder in the 100-yard dash, Alan Webb, U.S. mile record holder, and Nick Willis, a four-time Olympian and a two-time Olympic medallist, with a silver medal at the Beijing Olympics in 2008, and a bronze at the summer Rio Olympics in 2016, Joseph Ellis, a multiple-time Big Ten champion and first-team All American in the hammer throw and member of the British national team, and Andrew Liskowitz, a Big Ten champion and first-team all American in the shot put.

Women's track and field
Women's track and field was established as a varsity sport in 1978. The team has won 18 Big Ten titles (eight outdoor and ten indoor). James Henry has been the head coach since 1984. The Wolverines have had their strongest finishes in the NCAA chaampionship meet in recent years—finishing third outdoors in 2007 and third indoors in 2008. Notable alumna include Lisa Larsen Weidenbach Rainsberger, who won the Boston and Chicago Marathons.

Women's volleyball

The women's volleyball program at the University of Michigan began in 1973. Mark Rosen has been the head coach since 1999 and has led the team to the NCAA Tournament in 18 of his 22 years as head coach, as well as took the program to its first-ever national semifinal in the NCAA Tournament in 2012.

Women's water polo

Women's water polo became a varsity sport at the University of Michigan in 2001. In its first nine years, the program has placed first in the conference nine times, won eight NCAA division titles and four NCAA eastern titles, and appeared four times in the NCAA national tournament. The Wolverines finished in the Top 5 at the national tournament in 2002 and 2009.

In the spring of 2014, the Athletic Department hired Dr. Marcelo Leonardi as their new head coach. Dr. Marcelo Leonardi is in his first season as head coach for the Michigan women's water polo team. Leonardi took over the Michigan women's water polo program after spending the past five seasons as the women's water polo coach at California State University in Northridge. He also serves as the national technical director for the women's Olympic Development Program (ODP) associated with the organization since 2013. Caitlin Haskell, the assistant coach, played varsity water polo at University of California, Irvine. The Wolverines enter their 15th season in 2015. Former Olympic Gold Medalist Betsey Armstrong was hired as the assistant coach in 2012.

Wrestling

Wrestling has been a varsity sport at Michigan since 1921. The Wolverines have finished in the Top 5 in the NCAA tournament 19 times. Home dual meets and tournaments take place at Cliff Keen Arena, dedicated and named after longtime wrestling coach Cliff Keen, who coached the team from 1925 until 1970 and led the Wolverines wrestling team to 13 Big Ten Conference championships. The Michigan wrestling team has produced 175 individual NCAA All-Americans dating back to 1928, has 22 individual NCAA Championships for the university, and made two winners of the NCAA Most Outstanding Wrestler Award (1940, 1978).

A few notable former Wolverine wrestlers include Olympic gold medalist Steve Fraser, 1978 NCAA Most Outstanding Wrestler Mark Churella, professional wrestlers The Steiner Brothers and 2006 Greco-Roman World Wrestling Champion Joe Warren, currently a mixed martial artist in Bellator MMA.

Sponsorship

Michigan Athletics announced in July 2015 that it would switch from sponsorship by Adidas to Nike. The deal at the time had an estimated value of $169 million and was described as "the richest apparel deal in intercollegiate athletics". In April 2016, the University announced the signing of an 11-year $127.12 million contract for 31 Michigan sports teams, going into effect on August 1. With the agreement, Michigan Wolverines football became the first football program to wear Jordan Brand attire accompanied by the jumpman logo. Nike identifies the yellow color in the new uniforms as "Amarillo" rather than the traditional "Maize".

Varsity club sports

In 2000, athletic director Bill Martin announced the creation of a special level for sports at Michigan called Varsity Club status. The new system was established to recognize and increase support for club sports teams that have reached a level of budget, organization and competition that is similar to varsity levels. Varsity club squads are not necessarily closer to being elevated to full varsity status, and will remain for the time being primarily self-funded and administered through the Department of Recreational Sports. However, the designation will give these teams a closer relationship to the U-M athletic department. The Varsity Club status has proven to be a launching pad for sports to eventually become varsity sports at Michigan. In May 2011, men's and women's lacrosse were officially granted varsity status. Men's lacrosse began their first season of NCAA competition in 2012, and the women's program began varsity competition in 2014.

Current varsity club sports:
 Men's rowing
 Women's synchronized skating
 Women's synchronized swimming

Club sports
The Club Sports Program at the University of Michigan, administered by the Department of Recreational Sports, comprises 37 club sports. Each club sport is a student-led organization composed primarily of students, faculty, and staff. Each club is formed, developed, governed, and administered by the student membership of that particular club, working with the Club Sports Program staff.

The club sports programs include:

 Alpine skiing
 Baseball
 Boxing – Men
 Boxing – Women
 Brazilian jiu-jitsu
 Climbing
 Cycling
 Dance
 Esports
 Fencing
 Field Hockey
 Gymnastics
 Ice Hockey – Men
 Ice Hockey – Women
 Lacrosse – Women
 Rifle
 Roller Hockey
 Rugby – Men
 Rugby – Women

 Running
 Sailing
 Shotokan
 Soccer – Men
 Soccer – Women
 Softball
 Tae Kwon Do
 Tennis
 Triathlon
 Ultimate Frisbee – Men
 Ultimate Frisbee – Women
 Volleyball – Men
 Volleyball – Women
 Water Polo – Men
 Water Polo – Women
 Waterski
 Weightlifting
 Wrestling

Boxing
The men's and women's boxing teams compete as part of the United States Intercollegiate Boxing Association. The men's team won the USIBA national championship in 2014 and 2017, while the women's team won four straight championships from 2015 to 2018 and was the runner-up in the 2022 tournament. Michigan also hosted the 2015 USIBA tournament.

Rugby

The University of Michigan Rugby Football Club plays college rugby in the Big Ten Universities conference of Division I-A against its traditional rivals such as Michigan State and Ohio State. The Michigan rugby club was formed in 1959, although rugby at Michigan dates back to at least 1890 before fading from campus. Michigan rugby is led by head coach Brandon Sparks. Michigan reached the 2013 Big Ten championship match, where they lost to Indiana 58–38. Michigan played in the 2014 Collegiate Rugby Championship, notching some upset wins to reach the quarterfinals in a tournament broadcast live on NBC from PPL Park in Philadelphia. Michigan returned to the 2015 Collegiate Rugby Championship, where they notched wins against UCLA and Texas to again reach the quarterfinals.

Athletic facilities

Other facilities

Championships

NCAA team championships
Michigan has won 39 NCAA team national championships.

Men's (36)
 Baseball (2): 1953, 1962
 Basketball (1): 1989
 Golf † (2): 1934, 1935
 Gymnastics (6): 1963, 1970, 1999, 2010, 2013, 2014
 Ice Hockey (9): 1948, 1951, 1952, 1953, 1955, 1956, 1964, 1996, 1998
 Swimming (12): 1937, 1938, 1939, 1940, 1941, 1948, 1957, 1958, 1959, 1961, 1995, 2013
 Tennis (1): 1957
 Outdoor Track & Field (1): 1923
 Trampoline (2): 1969, 1970
Women's (3)
 Field Hockey (1): 2001
 Gymnastics (1): 2021
 Softball (1): 2005

† The NCAA started sponsoring the intercollegiate golf championship in 1939, but it retained the titles from the 41 championships previously conferred by the National Intercollegiate Golf Association in its records.

See also: 
List of NCAA schools with the most NCAA Division I championships
Big Ten Conference NCAA national team championships

Other national team championships
 Below are the 18 national team titles that were not bestowed by the NCAA (although seven were unofficial NCAA championships):
 Men's
 Football (11): 1901, 1902, 1903, 1904, 1918, 1923, 1932, 1933, 1947, 1948, 1997
 Swimming (7): 1927, 1928, 1931, 1932, 1934, 1935, 1936

UM's official NCAA Division I national championships have come from 11 different sports – this broad-based success is the fifth most in the NCAA record book. Only UCLA and Stanford, each with titles in 16 varying sports, USC in 15, and Texas in 12, have more diverse championship histories than the Wolverines.

University of Michigan teams have also been national runners-up 41 times in 14 different sports: baseball (1), men's basketball (6), women's cross country (1), field hockey (2), men's golf (3), men's gymnastics (2), women's gymnastics (2), men's ice hockey (3), rowing (2), softball (1), men's swimming and diving (10), women's swimming and diving (1), men's outdoor track and field (1), and wrestling (6).

See also: 
List of Big Ten Conference National Championships
List of NCAA schools with the most Division I national championships

NCAA Division I Directors' Cup

In the NCAA Division I Director's Cup (renamed Learfield Sports Directors' Cup), Michigan has ranked No. 1 in the Big Ten rankings in 16 out of the last 28 years ending in 2021–22; the university has ranked in the top 5 nationally a total of 15 years during that 28-year span.

Olympians
Through the 2008 Summer Olympics, 204 UM students and coaches had participated in the Olympics, winning medals at each Summer Olympic Games except 1896, and winning gold medals in all but four Olympiads. Through the year 2020, UM students/student-coaches (e.g., notably, Michael Phelps) have won a total of 185 Olympic medals: 85 Golds, 48 Silvers, and 52 Bronzes.

Athletic directors

Mascot
The Michigan Wolverines is one of the few college sports teams that does not have a live or costumed mascot, largely for reasons of tradition.  In the late 1920s, the Wolverines did have an unofficial mascot – Biff, the Michigan Wolverine.  The first Biff was a stuffed wolverine.  The second Biff was a live wolverine, who had a companion named Bennie, but the two mustelids grew to become too ferocious to be taken to games, which ended their career as mascots.

See also
 List of college athletic programs in Michigan
 Big Ten Athlete of the Year
 University of Michigan Athletic Hall of Honor

References

External links